Nyoma is a genus of longhorn beetles of the subfamily Lamiinae, containing the following species:

 Nyoma albopunctata Breuning, 1977
 Nyoma costata (Breuning, 1949)
 Nyoma fuscomaculata (Breuning, 1971)
 Nyoma fuscosignata (Breuning, 1948)
 Nyoma kyamburensis Adlbauer, 1998
 Nyoma papiella Quentin & Villiers, 1981
 Nyoma parallela Duvivier, 1892
 Nyoma pusilla (Breuning, 1943)

References

Desmiphorini
Cerambycidae genera